The King of Pigs is a South Korean web series starring Kim Dong-wook, Kim Sung-kyu, and Chae Jung-an. A live-action remake of Yeon Sang-ho's 2011 animated film of the same name, the series depicts a thriller drama of those who brought out memories of violence due to a mysterious serial murder that began with a message from a friend 20 years ago. It premiered on TVING on March 18, 2022.

Cast

Main 
 Kim Dong-wook as Hwang Kyung-min, who lives without forgetting the memories of school violence 20 years ago.
 Lee Chan-yu as young Hwang Kyung-min 
 Kim Sung-kyu as Jung Jong-seok, a detective who tracks messages from a friend 20 years ago.
 Shim Hyun-Seo as young Jung Jong-seok.
 Chae Jung-an as Kang Jin-ah, a charismatic detective who is a strong-willed principle dist and is obsessed with cases.
 Choi Hyun-jin as  Kim Cheol, a classmate who had guts to fight the bullies.

Supporting

People around Hwang Kyung-min 
 Han Soo-yeon as Park Min-joo, Kyung-min's wife.
 Lee Ji-ha as Kyung-min's mother.
 Ryoo Sung-Hyun as Kyung-min's abusive father.

Others 
 Hwang Man-ik as Park Seong-jin.
 Jung Eui-jae as Jin Hae-soo, the youngest detective on the powerful team that investigates a mysterious serial murder case.
 Oh Min-suk as Kang Min
 Ji Chan as Cho Pil-doo, Jong-seok's colleague.
 Park Jin as Doo Man-jae, is a police detective who helps Jung Suk uncover the case.
 Kim Min-sik as Kim Min-seok, the youngest member of the Seodong Police Station's first strong team.
 Yang So-min as Kim Hyeon-jeong, an acquaintance of Hwang Kyung-min's wife and the director of neuropsychiatry.
 Lee Tae-gum as Seo Dong-jin, Gwangsudae's team leader. 
 Kim Min-seok as Choi Seong-gyu, one of the students who brutally commit school violence against Hwang Kyung-min.
Bae Yu-ram as Park Chan-young 
 Choi Kwang-je as  Ahn Jung-hee
Lee Kyoung-young as Choi Suk-Ki, a corrupted teacher who loves money and tolerates school bullying.
 Woo Mi-hwa as Kim Cheol’s mother.

Release
The series first aired on the online streaming service TVING on March 18, 2022, with a 19+ rating.

On June 2, 2022, it was reported that The King of Pigs would be rerun on OCN on June 19, 2022, with a 19+ rating as with its original airing.

In July 2022, it was confirmed that the drama would be shown at Fantasia 2022, making it the first drama series to be shown at the festival.

Ratings

References

External links 
  
 
 

TVING original programming
2022 South Korean television series debuts
Korean-language television shows
2022 web series debuts
2022 web series endings
South Korean web series
South Korean drama web series
Television remakes of films
Works about school violence